Um Sidir is a Sudanese town located near Al-Fashir, capital of North Darfur. It was controlled by rebel forces until August 31, 2006, when it was recaptured by the Sudanese government.

It was subsequently recaptured by the National Redemption Front by 12 September.  The fighting is a continuation of the three and a half-year civil war in Darfur.

Populated places in North Darfur